Nuori Voima (Finnish: Youthful Vigor) is a Finnish literary and cultural magazine which has been published since 1908. It is headquartered in Helsinki, Finland. Both the magazine and its parent organization, Nuoren Voiman Liitto, are among the well-respected institutions in Finland.

History and profile
Nuori Voima was founded in 1908. The magazine was founded and published by the Nuoren Voiman Liitto (Finnish: The Union of Young Powers), a non-profit literature organization. It comes out five times a year. The magazine produces thematic issues and features literary work and articles written about art, philosophy, culture and society. It has a twice per year literary critic supplement, Kritiikki.

Some of the significant international contributors to Nuori Voima include French philosophers Roland Barthes, Jacques Derrida and Michel Foucault as well as Jacques Lacan. The magazine also featured work by Walter Benjamin, Mikhail Bakhtin and Peter Sloterdijk. Finnish poet Olavi Paavolainen started his career in the magazine.

Martti-Tapio Kuuskoski served as the editor-in-chief of Nuori Voima.

References

External links
  

1908 establishments in Finland
Cultural magazines
Finnish-language magazines
Literary magazines published in Finland
Magazines established in 1908
Magazines published in Helsinki
Philosophy magazines
Poetry literary magazines